A derailment of a passenger train occurred on 18 February 2017 at , Belgium. One person was killed and 27 were injured. The cause of the derailment was excessive speed through a set of points.

Accident
At 13:13 CET (12:13 UTC), a 3-car passenger train operated by a single Class 80 electric multiple unit No.326 was derailed shortly after leaving . The front carriage fell on its side, the centre carriage was derailed and the rear carriage remained on the tracks. It had travelled  when the accident happened. One person was killed and 27 were injured, three seriously. Fourteen of the victims were taken to hospital. A further 57 passengers were uninjured. It was initially thought that the victim was not on board the train, but this theory was later discounted and it was confirmed that he was a passenger.

Belgian Prime Minister Charles Michel visited the site. He tweeted his thanks to the emergency services for their rapid intervention following the accident.

One track was reopened to traffic by 18:00. The three carriages of the train were removed from the site during the night of 19–20 February.

Investigations
The Railway Accident and Incident Investigation Unit, Belgian police, and SNCB have opened investigations into the accident. The police investigation revealed excessive speed through a set of points to be the cause of the derailment.

According to the Railway Accident and Incident Investigation Unit final report, the driver was distracted and accelerated too soon and the train protection system (TBL1++) was not designed to monitor the speed and apply emergency braking in this particular sequence of events (Green Yellow Horizontal signal). Also may have been confused by the complex track and signal layout and by a misleading speed sign meant for another track, which was promptly removed.

References

Railway accidents in 2017
Derailments in Belgium
Derailment 2017
February 2017 events in Europe
Accidents and incidents involving SNCB
2017 in Belgium
2017 disasters in Belgium